The following people have been employed by or are otherwise currently employed on the faculty at Ohio University in Athens, Ohio.

Distinguished faculty
The university recognizes faculty each year as endowed "Distinguished Professors"

Other notable faculty 
 Jon Edward Ahlquist, zoologist
 Khalid Albudoor, poet
 Jon Anderson, taught poetry
 Terry A. Anderson, journalist
 Eddie Ashworth, media arts and studies professor
 Erin Belieu, poet
 John Joseph Brady, journalist
 Frank Ching, taught drawing
 William E. Connolly, political theorist
 Antonio Cua, philosopher
 Stephen Custer, cellist
 Hamza El Din, composer
 Pam Durban, novelist
 Aethelred Eldridge, painter
 Walter S. Gamertsfelder, professor of philosophy, later dean and president of Ohio University
 David Macinnis Gill, novelist, taught English
 Frank Pierrepont Graves, taught education
 Melvin Helitzer, taught journalism
 Jeffrey Herf, taught history
 Paul Hersey, entrepreneur
 Granville Hicks, educator and writer
 David Hostetler, sculptor
 Josh Hyde, filmmaker
 Colette Inez, composer
 William Wartenbee Johnson, former trustee
 Daniel Keyes, author
 Brian Kiteley, novelist
 Kathy Krendl, former Provost, now President of Otterbein University
 Karl Kroeger, composer
 P. Lal, poet
 Raymond Luebbers, electrical engineer
 Hilary Masters, taught writing
 Nathaniel Massie, former trustee
 Kevin Mattson, historian and critic
 Zakes Mda, taught English
 Dinty W. Moore, teaches English
 Benjamin M. Ogles, Dean at Brigham Young University, former dean of Arts and Sciences
 Charles L. Peterson, painter
 Cosmo Pieterse, playwright
 Ilmar Raag, film director
 J. Allyn Rosser, poet
 Alfred Ryors, taught mathematics; former Ohio University president
 Eve Shelnutt, poet
 Brian Smith, photographer
 Thomas S. Smith, former Provost
 Pete Souza, photojournalist that later chronicled Barack Obama's presidency
 Darrell Spencer, taught creative writing
 David E. Sweet, taught political science
 Joe Tait, taught sportscasting
 Eli Todd Tappan, taught mathematics
 Mark Tatge, taught journalism
 Walter Tevis, taught creative writing
 William Thon, taught painting
 Shane Tilton, teaches electronic media
 Irma Voigt, first Dean of Women at Ohio University (1913–1949)
 James J. Whalen, former executive vice president
 Robert Whealey, professor emeritus 
 Lawrence Witmer, paleontologist
 Mark Wunderlich, poet
 Sarah E. Wyatt, plant molecular biologist
 Gladys Bailin, choreographer and dancer

References

Ohio University faculty